The pilot episode, also known as "Northwest Passage", of the mystery television series Twin Peaks premiered on the ABC Network on Sunday, April 8, 1990. It was written by series creators Mark Frost and David Lynch, and directed by Lynch. The pilot follows the characters of Dale Cooper and Harry S. Truman as they investigate the death of popular high school student Laura Palmer; Cooper believes the murder has connections to a murder case that occurred a year earlier. In addition to setting the tone for the show, the episode sets up several character and story arcs and marked the appearance of several recurring characters. The episode received a strong Nielsen household rating compared to other season one episodes and was well received by fans and critics alike. The original title for the series was Northwest Passage, but this was later changed.

Plot overview

The small northwest town of Twin Peaks, Washington is shaken when the body of Laura Palmer is discovered washed up on a riverbank, wrapped in plastic. FBI Special Agent Dale Cooper (Kyle MacLachlan) is called in when Ronnette Pulaski, who attended the same high school as Palmer, is found wandering on a bridge before lapsing into a coma. Cooper believes there is a connection between Palmer's death and the death of another girl named Teresa Banks that happened a year earlier. Cooper discovers a small piece of paper with the letter "R" on it shoved under Laura's fingernail. He tells Sheriff Harry S. Truman (Michael Ontkean) that under Banks's nail he found a "T". Meanwhile, the Palmer family and friends struggle to come to terms with her death, and wonder how it might have come about.

Believing that this is the same killer who struck the previous year, Cooper starts an official investigation. Meanwhile, the rebellious Audrey Horne (Sherilyn Fenn) ruins a business deal for her father Benjamin Horne (Richard Beymer); Sheriff Truman arrests Palmer's boyfriend Bobby Briggs (Dana Ashbrook), who is secretly seeing a married waitress named Shelly; Palmer's best friend Donna Hayward (Lara Flynn Boyle) and Palmer's secret boyfriend James Hurley (James Marshall) discover a mutual attraction; and Laura's mother is terrified by a vision.

The episode has two different endings, depending on which version of the episode one is watching. The American version ends with the above events, concluded by Sarah Palmer's nightmare of a hand digging into the ground and grabbing James's half of a necklace that belonged to Laura.

The international version was filmed with 20 extra minutes of footage in case the series was not picked up by the networks, rather allowing them to release it as a Television movie. It contains scenes from episode one, where Sarah realises that there was a man hiding in Laura's room when she checked in it the previous day. It also contains the ending to episode two, when Cooper dreams of meeting Laura and a mysterious man who speaks to him in a disjointed voice. It also reveals who Laura's killers were.

Production

Conception and writing
David Lynch and Mark Frost pitched the idea to ABC during the time of the Writers Guild of America, East strike in 1988 in a ten-minute meeting with the network's drama head, Chad Hoffman, with nothing more than this image and a concept. According to the director, the mystery of who killed Laura Palmer was initially going to be in the foreground, but would recede gradually as viewers got to know the other townsfolk and the problems they were having. Lynch and Frost wanted to mix a police investigation with a soap opera.

ABC liked the idea, and asked Lynch and Frost to write a screenplay for the pilot episode. Frost wrote more verbal characters, like Benjamin Horne, while Lynch was responsible for Agent Dale Cooper. According to the director, "He says a lot of the things I say". Originally, the show was entitled Northwest Passage and set in North Dakota, but the fact that a town called Northwest Passage really exists prompted a revision in the script. They filmed the pilot for $1.8 million with an agreement with ABC that they would shoot an additional "ending" to it so that it could be sold directly to video in Europe as a feature if the TV show was not picked up. However, even though ABC's Bob Iger liked the pilot, he had a tough time persuading the rest of the network brass. Iger suggested showing it to a more diverse, younger group, who liked it, and the executive subsequently convinced ABC to buy seven episodes at $1.1 million apiece. Some executives figured that the show would never get on the air, believing it would meet negative reviews from viewers and critics alike. However, Iger planned to schedule it for the spring. The final showdown occurred during a bi-coastal conference call between Iger and a room full of New York executives; Iger won, and Twin Peaks was on the air.

Improvised elements

At several points during the filming of the pilot episode, David Lynch improvised by incorporating on-set accidents into the story. The most notable of these occurred when set decorator Frank Silva was being told to be careful to not get stuck in a room while furniture was being moved around. Lynch heard this and he says that the image of Silva being stuck intrigued him. Lynch then shot some footage of Silva perching behind Laura Palmer's bed, but was unsure as to what he would do with it. Silva was then accidentally filmed in a mirror during Sarah Palmer's vision at the end of the pilot. The camera operator insisted that Lynch do another take because of the mistake, but he liked it so much he kept it in the show, and cast Silva as Killer BOB, the mysterious tormentor of Laura Palmer.

During the filming of the scene in which Dale Cooper first examines Laura's body, a malfunctioning fluorescent light above the table flickered constantly, but Lynch decided not to replace it, since he liked the disconcerting effect that it created. Also, during the take, one of the minor actors misheard a line and, thinking he was being asked his name, he told Cooper his real name instead of saying his line, briefly throwing everyone off balance. Lynch was reportedly pleased with the lifelike, unscripted moment in dialogue, and kept the mistake in the final cut.

Previews
The pilot was first shown in September 1989 at the Telluride Film Festival. That same month, Connoisseur magazine ran a cover story calling Twin Peaks "the series that will change TV forever." After viewing the episode, Tom Shales of The Washington Post wrote "Twin Peaks isn’t just a visit to another town; it’s a visit to another planet. Maybe it will go down in history as a brief and brave experiment. But as can be said of few other TV shows in the near or immediate future: This You Gotta See."

On February 10, 1990, it was shown as part of the Miami Film Festival. Sun-Sentinel writer Robert Hurlburt wrote "the Lynchian sense of impending danger and kinky sexual undercurrents, coupled with excellent music, makes the Twin Peaks pilot work almost too well.  You'll want to see the entire package in one sitting.  But the series may lay an egg on television because of its drawn-out and deliberate pacing, brutality, sex with violence and a hint of something else ... something deadly, yet unseen and probably repulsive."

In April, a screening was also held at the Museum of Broadcasting in Hollywood. Media analyst and advertising executive Paul Schulman said, "I don't think it has a chance of succeeding. It is not commercial, it is radically different from what we as viewers are accustomed to seeing, there's no one in the show to root for."

Release

Ratings and awards
The two-hour pilot was the highest-rated movie for the 1989–1990 season with a 21.7 rating and was viewed by 34.6 million people. In Los Angeles, Twin Peaks became the seventh most-watched show of the week earning 29% of viewers, the most-watched show being Married... with Children which gathered 34% of viewers. The following episode, "Traces to Nowhere" would start with a significant drop in ratings with only 23.2 million people tuning in. Various media such as The New York Times and local radio stations announced that the show had managed to grow a cult following.

For the 42nd Primetime Emmy Awards, the pilot episode was nominated six times, including "Outstanding Directing in a Drama Series" for David Lynch, "Outstanding Lead Actor in a Drama Series" for Kyle MacLachlan as Dale Cooper, and "Outstanding Writing in a Drama Series" for Mark Frost and Lynch. The pilot won two awards, with frequent Lynch collaborator Patricia Norris winning for "Outstanding Costume Design for a Series" and Duwayne Dunham winning the "Outstanding Editing for a Series - Single Camera Production". The pilot also received a Peabody Award in 1990.

The pilot's international release tells the story of the series in a self-contained manner, and includes 20 minutes of additional footage.

Critical reception
Initially, the show's Thursday night time slot was not a good one for soap operas as both Dynasty and its short-lived spin-off The Colbys did poorly. Twin Peaks was also up against the hugely successful sitcom Cheers. Initially, the show received a positive response from TV critics. Tom Shales, in The Washington Post, wrote, "Twin Peaks disorients you in ways that small-screen productions seldom attempt. It's a pleasurable sensation, the floor dropping out and leaving one dangling." In The New York Times, John J. O'Connor wrote, "Twin Peaks is not a sendup of the form. Mr. Lynch clearly savors the standard ingredients...but then the director adds his own peculiar touches, small passing details that suddenly, and often hilariously, thrust the commonplace out of kilter."

Many critics saw the pilot as "the movie that will change TV" history, according to Diana White from The Boston Globe. Ken Tucker from Entertainment Weekly was strongly positive about the episode, giving it a A+. While liking the story, and calling Lynch's directing beautiful, he said "[there is] not a chance in hell" the show could become a ratings hit, because of its "unsettling" story. David Zurawik from The Baltimore Sun compared the pilot to the work of Alfred Hitchcock. He also said its cinematography was "about as close as prime-time television gets to art." Jen Chaney from The Washington Post called the pilot "one of the most finely crafted series kick-offs in broadcast history".

In 1997, TV Guide ranked the pilot #25 on its list of the 100 Greatest Episodes.

Home video release/Alternative Extended European Pilot
Due to rights issues, the American pilot (94 minutes long) was not released in the United States home video market until 2007. The alternative extended European pilot (116 minutes) had been released on VHS and laser disc years earlier. This alternate version of the pilot was aired in Europe as a stand-alone television movie. The European version is identical to the United States-aired version up until the last several scenes, when the killer of Laura Palmer is revealed. Both versions of the pilot are included in the Twin Peaks: Definitive Gold Box Edition DVD set, released in the US on October 30, 2007. Lynch was so pleased with the footage shot for the European ending that he later incorporated some of it into Cooper's dream sequences that aired in the subsequent acclaimed Episode 2.

References

External links 

 

Twin Peaks (season 1) episodes
1990 American television episodes
Twin Peaks
Television episodes written by David Lynch
Television episodes written by Mark Frost
Peabody Award-winning broadcasts
Fiction with alternate endings
Television episodes about murder